14 (fourteen) is a natural number following 13 and preceding 15.

In relation to the word "four" (4), 14 is spelled "fourteen".

In mathematics

Fourteen is the seventh composite number. It is the lowest even  for which the equation  has no solution, making it the first even nontotient.

A set of real numbers to which it is applied closure and complement operations in any possible sequence generates 14 distinct sets. This holds even if the reals are replaced by a more general topological space; see Kuratowski's closure-complement problem.

14 is the first stella octangula number, and the second square pyramidal number.

14 is also the fourth Companion Pell number, and the fifth Catalan number.

There are fourteen polygons that can fill a plane-vertex tiling, where five polygons tile the plane uniformly, and nine others only tile the plane alongside irregular polygons. 

Several distinguished polyhedra in three dimensions contain fourteen faces or vertices as facets:
The cuboctahedron, one of two quasiregular polyhedra, has 14 faces and is the only uniform polyhedron with radial equilateral symmetry. Its dual polyhedron, the rhombic dodecahedron, contains 14 vertices and is the only Catalan solid that can tessellate space.
The truncated octahedron contains 14 faces, is the permutohedron of order four, and the only Archimedean solid to tessellate space. The truncated cube also has 14 faces, as does the dodecagonal prism, which is the largest prism that can tessellate space alongside other uniform prisms. 
The Szilassi polyhedron and its dual, the Császár polyhedron, are the simplest toroidal polyhedra. They have 14 vertices and 14 triangular faces, respectively.
Steffen's polyhedron, the simplest flexible polyhedron without self-crossings, has 14 triangular faces.

The regular tetrahedron, the simplest uniform polyhedron and Platonic solid, is made up of a total of 14 elements: 4 edges, 6 vertices, and 4 faces. 
Szilassi's polyhedron and the tetrahedron are the only two known polyhedra where each face shares an edge with each other face, while Császár's polyhedron and the tetrahedron are the only two known polyhedra with a continuous manifold boundary that do not contain any diagonals.
Two tetrahedra that are joined by a common edge whose four adjacent and opposite faces are replaced with two specific seven-faced crinkles will create a new flexible polyhedron, with a total of 14 possible clashes where faces can meet.pp.10-11,14 This is the second simplest known triangular flexible polyhedron, after Steffen's polyhedron.p.16
Furthermore, if three tetrahedra are joined at two separate opposing edges and made into a single flexible polyhedron, called a 2-dof flexible polyhedron, each hinge will only have a total range of motion of 14 degrees.p.139

There are fourteen possible Bravais lattices that fill three-dimensional space.

The exceptional Lie algebra G2 is the simplest of five such algebras, with a minimal faithful representation in fourteen dimensions. It is the automorphism group of the octonions , and holds a compact form homeomorphic to the zero divisors with entries of unit norm in the sedenions, .

In science

Chemistry
The atomic number of silicon
The approximate atomic weight of nitrogen
The maximum number of electrons that can fit in an f sublevel
 Group 14 elements in the periodic table.

Astronomy

Messier object M14, a magnitude 9.5 globular cluster in the constellation Ophiuchus
The New General Catalogue object NGC 14, a magnitude 12.5 irregular galaxy in the constellation Pegasus

In religion and mythology

Christianity
According to the Gospel of Matthew "there were fourteen generations in all from Abraham to David, fourteen generations from David to the exile to Babylon, and fourteen from the exile to the Messiah". (Matthew 1, 17)
The number of Stations of the Cross observed by some Christian denominations. 
The Fourteen Holy Helpers were a group of saints formerly venerated together by Roman Catholics.

Islam
The number of Muqattaʿat in the Quran.
Significant for Twelver Shia Muslims who follow the Fourteen Infallibles.

Hinduism
 The number of years of Rama's exile in the forest with Sita and Lakshman.

Mythology
The number of pieces the body of Osiris was torn into by his fratricidal brother Set.

The number of sacrificial victims of the Minotaur.

Age 14

14 is the earliest age that the emancipation of minors can occur in the U.S.
Minimum age a person can purchase, rent, or buy tickets to a 14A rated movie in Canada without an adult. Ratings are provincial, so ratings may vary. A movie can be 14A in one or some provinces and PG in other provinces. A movie can also be rated 14A in one or some provinces and 18A in other provinces. Quebec has a different rating system for films.
 Youngest age in Canada a person can watch a 14+ rated show without consent from a legal guardian.
The U.S. TV Parental Guidelines has a rating called "TV-14" which strongly recommends parental guidance for children under the age of fourteen watching the program.
Minimum age at which one can view, rent, purchase, or buy tickets to an 18A rated movie with an accompanying adult in the Canadian provinces of the Maritimes and Manitoba.
Minimum age at which one can work in many U.S. states. Parental consent may be required, depending on the state.
 Minimum age at which one can drive a vehicle in the U.S. with a driver's license (with the supervision of an adult over 18 years of age, and with a valid, unmarked driver's license, and at least 365 days of experience driving an actual automobile) 
The minimum age limit to drive a 50cc motorbike in Italy.
The most common age of criminal responsibility in Europe.
In some countries, it is the age of sexual consent.

In sports
 In American football, the National Football League playoffs have involved 14 teams since the 2020 season.
 In golf, a player can have no more than 14 clubs in the bag.
 In rugby union, the starting right wing wears the 14 shirt

In other fields
Fourteen is:
The number of days in a fortnight.
The Fourteenth Amendment to the United States Constitution gave citizenship to those of African descent, in a post-Civil War (Reconstruction) measure aimed at restoring the rights of slaves.
In traditional British units of weight, the number of pounds in a stone.
The number of points outlined by President Woodrow Wilson for reconstructing a new Europe following World War I, see Fourteen Points.
The number of Enigma Variations composed by Edward Elgar.
The number of favored rows in the Roman theater for members of the equestrian order according to the lex Roscia theatralis issued in 67 BC.
The section that one goes to when one dies in the GrailQuest books.
The number of legs on a woodlouse, as well as on Hallucigenia.
A common designation for the thirteenth floor in many buildings for superstitious reasons.
There are 14 British Overseas Territories of the United Kingdom.
The number of lines in a sonnet.
 The Number 14 airship by Alberto Santos Dumont was used to test the aerodynamics of his 14-bis airplane.
 The number of the French department Calvados.
 XIV is a storage server manufactured by IBM. It goes by name of "XIV" and is pronounced as the separate letters "X", "I", "V".
 The Piano Sonata No. 14, also known as Moonlight Sonata, is one of the most famous piano sonatas composed by Ludwig van Beethoven.
 A symbol of infinity in "The House of Asterion" ("", 1947) by Jorge Luis Borges, itself a reference to the 14 sacrificial victims of the Minotaur.
 The Fourteen Words are a phrase used by white supremacists.
 Nuestra Familia is a gang that uses "XIV" as their symbol because the 14th letter of the Spanish alphabet is "N".
 The room number on the top floor of the hospital where Oliver Hardy is visited by Stan Laurel in the movie County Hospital (1932).
In the epic fantasy series A Song of Ice and Fire, the Fourteen Flames are a chain of volcanoes that stretch across the Valyrian peninsula.
 There are 14 books in the main sequence of the epic fantasy series The Wheel of Time by Robert Jordan.
 The number of years Edmond Dantes spent imprisoned in the Chateau d'If in Alexandre Dumas' The Count of Monte Cristo.
 Unlike most other mammal species which commonly have 20 digits (toes), 14 is the number of digits of the guinea pig or domestic guinea pig (Cavia porcellus), also known as the cavy or domestic cavy.

See also 
 List of highways numbered 14

References

Integers